The Unwritten Law (German: Das ungeschriebene Gesetz) is a 1922 German silent drama film directed by Carl Boese and starring Grete Hollmann and Carl Auen.

It was shot at the Bavaria Studios in Munich.

Cast
 Grete Hollmann
 Marie Escher
 Carl Auen
 Karl Falkenberg
 Toni Wittels
 Josef Bertoli

References

Bibliography
 Grange, William. Cultural Chronicle of the Weimar Republic. Scarecrow Press, 2008.

External links

1922 films
Films of the Weimar Republic
Films directed by Carl Boese
German silent feature films
German black-and-white films
Bavaria Film films
Films shot at Bavaria Studios
German drama films
1922 drama films
Silent drama films
1920s German films
1920s German-language films